Bjørn Hansen is the name of:

 Bjørn Hansen (journalist) (born 1938), Norwegian journalist
 Bjørn Hansen (footballer) (1939–2018), Norwegian football player and coach
 Bjørn Lidin Hansen (1989–2016), Norwegian footballer
 Bjørn Hansen (soccer)
 Björn Hansen, Swedish sailor